Marcelo Ricardo Fronckowiak (born 14 March 1968) is a Brazilian professional volleyball coach and former player.  He currently serves as head coach for Tours VB.

Career

As a player
During his career, he won 3 Brazilian Champion titles in 1995, 1998 and 1999.

As a coach
Fronckowiak began his coaching career in 2002, leading Sport Club Ulbra to the Brazilian Champion title next year and the 2nd place in 2004.

During his work in France with Tourcoing LM, he won the CEV Challenge Cup bronze medal, and ended the 2008–09 season in 2nd place, losing the final matches to Paris Volley.

He came back to his native country in 2009 as a head coach of Minas Tênis Clube, and won a bronze medal in 2012. After joining Associação Desportiva RJX in 2012, he once again in his career won the Brazilian Champion title. In 2017, he became an assistant of Renan Dal Zotto in the Brazil national team, just before being dismissed from Vôlei Canoas, probably due to reduced budget for a new season.

For the 2018–19 season, he signed a contract with Cuprum Lubin in the Polish PlusLiga.

Personal life
Fronckowiak is of Polish descent.

Honours

As a player
 CSV South American Club Championship
  Ribeirão Preto 1991 – with Associação Atlética Frangosul
  São Paulo 1992 – with Clube Atlético Pirelli
 National championships
 1994/1995  Brazilian Championship, with Frangosul/Ginástica
 1997/1998  Brazilian Championship, with Canoas Sport Club 
 1998/1999  Brazilian Championship, with Canoas Sport Club

As a coach
 CEV Cup
  2021/2022 – with Tours VB
 National championships
 2002/2003  Brazilian Championship, with Canoas Sport Club
 2012/2013  Brazilian Championship, with Associação Desportiva RJX

References

External links
 
 Coach profile at LegaVolley.it 
 Coach/Player profile at Volleybox.net

1968 births
Living people
Sportspeople from Porto Alegre
Brazilian people of Polish descent
Brazilian men's volleyball players
Brazilian volleyball coaches
Volleyball coaches of international teams
Brazilian expatriate sportspeople in France
Brazilian expatriate sportspeople in Russia
Brazilian expatriate sportspeople in Italy
Brazilian expatriate sportspeople in Poland
Brazilian expatriate sportspeople in Slovenia
Cuprum Lubin coaches